Nanobacterium (pl. nanobacteria  ) is the unit or member name of a former proposed class of living organisms, specifically cell-walled microorganisms, now discredited, with a size much smaller than the generally accepted lower limit for life (about 200 nm for bacteria, like mycoplasma). Originally based on observed nano-scale structures in geological formations (including one meteorite), the status of nanobacteria was controversial, with some researchers suggesting they are a new class of living organism capable of incorporating radiolabeled uridine, and others attributing to them a simpler, abiotic nature. One skeptic dubbed them "the cold fusion of microbiology", in reference to a notorious episode of supposed erroneous science. The term "calcifying nanoparticles" (CNPs) has also been used as a conservative name regarding their possible status as a life form.

Research tends to agree that these structures exist, and appear to replicate in some way. However, the idea that they are living entities has now largely been discarded, and the particles are instead thought to be nonliving crystallizations of minerals and organic molecules.

1981–2000
In 1981 Torella and Morita described very small cells called ultramicrobacteria. Defined as being smaller than 300 nm, by 1982 MacDonell and Hood found that some could pass through a 200 nm membrane. Early in 1989, geologist Robert L. Folk found what he later identified as nannobacteria (written with double "n"), that is, nanoparticles isolated from geological specimens in travertine from hot springs of Viterbo, Italy.  Initially searching for a bacterial cause for travertine deposition, scanning electron microscope examination of the mineral where no bacteria were detectable revealed extremely small objects which appeared to be biological.  His first oral presentation elicited what he called "mostly a stony silence", at the 1992 Geological Society of America's annual convention. He proposed that nanobacteria are the principal agents of precipitation of all minerals and crystals on Earth formed in liquid water, that they also cause all oxidation of metals, and that they are abundant in many biological specimens.

In 1996, NASA scientist David McKay published a study suggesting the existence of nanofossils — fossils of Martian nanobacteria — in ALH84001, a meteorite originating from Mars and found in Antarctica.

Nanobacterium sanguineum was proposed in 1998 as an explanation of certain kinds of pathologic calcification (apatite in kidney stones) by Finnish researcher Olavi Kajander and Turkish researcher Neva Çiftçioğlu, working at the University of Kuopio in Finland. According to the researchers the particles self-replicated in microbiological culture, and the researchers further reported having identified DNA in these structures by staining.

A paper published in 2000 by a team led by an NIH scientist John Cisar further tested these ideas. It stated that what had previously been described as "self-replication" was a form of crystalline growth. The only DNA detected in his specimens was identified as coming from the bacteria Phyllobacterium myrsinacearum, which is a common contaminant in PCR reactions.

2001–present
In 2004 a Mayo Clinic team led by Franklin Cockerill, John Lieske, and Virginia M. Miller, reported to have isolated nanobacteria from diseased human arteries and kidney stones. Their results were published in 2004 and 2006 respectively. Similar findings were obtained in 2005 by László Puskás at the DNA Lab, University of Szeged, Hungary. Dr. Puskás identified these particles in cultures obtained from human atherosclerotic aortic walls and blood samples of atherosclerotic patients but the group was unable to detect DNA in these samples.

In 2005, Ciftcioglu and her research team at NASA used a rotating cell culture flask, which simulates some aspects of low-gravity conditions, to culture nanobacteria suspected of rapidly forming kidney stones in astronauts. In this environment, they were found to multiply five times faster than in normal Earth gravity. The study concluded that nanobacteria might have a potential role in forming kidney stones and may need to be screened for in crews pre-flight.

The February 2008 Public Library of Science Pathogens (PLOS Pathogens) article focused on the comprehensive characterization of nanobacteria. The authors say that their results rule out the existence of nanobacteria as living entities and that they are instead a unique self-propagating entity, namely self-propagating mineral-fetuin complexes.

An April 2008 Proceedings of the National Academy of Sciences (PNAS) article also reported that blood nanobacteria are not living organisms and stated that "CaCO3 precipitates prepared in vitro are remarkably similar to purported nanobacteria in terms of their uniformly sized, membrane-delineated vesicular shapes, with cellular division-like formations and aggregations in the form of colonies." The growth of such "biomorphic" inorganic precipitates was studied in detail in a 2009 Science paper, which showed that unusual crystal growth mechanisms can produce witherite precipitates from barium chloride and silica solutions that closely resemble primitive organisms. The authors commented on the close resemblance of these crystals to putative nanobacteria, stating that their results showed that evidence for life cannot rest on morphology alone.

Further work on the importance of nanobacteria in geology by R. L. Folk and co-workers includes study of calcium carbonate Bahama ooids, silicate clay minerals, metal sulfides, and iron oxides. In all these chemically diverse minerals, the putative nanobacteria are approximately the same size, mainly 0.05 to 0.2 μm. This suggests a commonality of origin. At least for the type locality at Viterbo, Italy, the biogenicity of these minute cells has been supported by transmission electron microscopy (TEM). Slices through a green bioslime showed entities from 0.4 down to as small as 0.09 μm with definite cell walls and interior dots resembling ribosomes; and even smaller objects with cell walls and lucent interiors with diameters of 0.05 μm. Culturable organisms on earth are the same 0.05 μm size as the supposed nanobacteria on Mars.

See also

 Mycoplasma — smallest known bacteria (300 nm)
 Nanoarchaeum — smallest known archaeum (400 nm)
 Nanobe — possible smallest lifeforms (20 nm)
 Pandoravirus — one of the largest known viruses (1000 nm)
 Parvovirus — smallest known viruses (18-28 nm)
 Pithovirus — largest known virus (1500 nm)
 Prion — smallest known infectious agent (≈10 nm)
 Protocell
 Ultramicrobacteria — possible dormant forms of larger cells (200 nm)

References

External links
Nanobacteria: Facts or Fancies?
From Scum, Perhaps the Tiniest Form of Life, NY Times December 23, 2006
Are Nanobacteria Making Us Ill?, Wired News, Mar. 14, 2005
Claim made for new form of life, BBC News, May 19, 2004
Infectious Microorganism Linked to Kidney Stones and other Diseases, February 2005
Nannobacteria Research Page of the Department of Geosciences, Mississippi State University
New Scientist article about nanobacteria
The Calcium Bomb — The Nanobacteria Link to Heart Disease and Cancer

The Time Travelers Academy, a science fiction novel; it tells a story about the nanobacteria found in Martian meteorites.
 Selected publications of Robert L. Folk on nanobacteria

Bacterial diseases
Geomicrobiology
Unsolved problems in biology
Hypothetical life forms